McGuinty is a surname of Irish origin. Notable people with the surname include:

Dalton McGuinty (born 1955), Canadian former politician
Dalton McGuinty Sr. (1926-1990), Canadian politician
David McGuinty (born 1960), Canadian lawyer and politician

See also
McGinty